The July 23, 1961, race at Meadowdale International Raceway  was the eighth racing event of the eleventh season of the Sports Car Club of America's 1961 Championship Racing Series.

A&B Production Results

References

External links
Etceterini.com
RacingSportsCars.com
Dick Lang Racing History

Meadowdale